The Chattanooga Black Lookouts were a minor league Negro league baseball team based in Chattanooga, Tennessee.  They were established in 1920, only to play for one season.  They were reestablished in 1926 to play for two seasons, serving as a farm team of the Homestead Grays of the Negro Northern League.

In 1926 the team purchased the contract of Satchel Paige from the semi-pro Mobile Tigers.  On May 1, 1926, Paige made his Negro minor league debut. When Satchel Paige joined the team they were called the Chattanooga White Sox.

External links
Negro League Baseball Players Association
Negro league baseball teams
Sports in Chattanooga, Tennessee
Professional baseball teams in Tennessee
Defunct baseball teams in Tennessee
Baseball teams disestablished in 1927
Baseball teams established in 1920